Allan Stig Rasmussen (born 20 November 1983) is a Danish chess grandmaster. He is a four-time Danish Chess Champion.

Chess career
Born in 1983, Rasmussen earned his international master title in 2008 and his grandmaster title in 2009. He has won the Danish Chess Championship in 2010, 2011, 2014 and 2019.

References

External links

1983 births
Living people
Chess grandmasters
Danish chess players
Sportspeople from Aarhus